This article lists both active and historic seaplane bases in the United Kingdom, many of which were either used for, or planned to be used for, the defence of the UK.

A seaplane base may be anything from a stretch of water where seaplanes were based to a full installation, either floating (powered or unpowered) or shore based, where seaplanes were serviced.  In the UK these are presumed to be coastal.

Active seaplane bases
Glasgow Seaplane Terminal, Glasgow
Oban Bay, Oban
Loch Lomond
Tobermory, Isle of Mull
Enniskillen

Proposed seaplane base
 Royal Albert Docks, London City Airport.

Former bases
RAF Alness, Alness, Ross and Cromarty
Bembridge Harbour, Isle of Wight (1915-1919)
Brough Aerodrome, East Riding of Yorkshire
RNAS Calshot/RAF Calshot, Hampshire
RAF Castle Archdale, Lough Erne, Northern Ireland
RAF Catfirth, Shetland Islands (1917-1919)
Cromarty, Ross & Cromarty (1913-1915)
RNAS Donibristle, Dalgety Bay, Fife
RNAS Dundee (HMS Condor II), Dundee, Angus
RNAS Felixstowe, Suffolk
RAF Greenock, Greenock, Inverclyde
RNAS Hickling Broad, Norfolk
RNAS Hornsea Mere, East Yorkshire
RAF Houton, Orkney
RNAS Kingsnorth, Kent
RNAS Lawrenny Ferry, Pembrokeshire
RNAS Lee-on-Solent (HMS Daedalus), Hampshire
RAF Mount Batten, Plymouth, Devon (was RNAS Cattewater)
Newhaven Seaplane Base, Tide Mills, east of Newhaven Harbour, Sussex
RAF Pembroke Dock, Pembrokeshire
RNAS Portland (HMS Osprey), Portland, Dorset
RNAS Tresco, Isles of Scilly
Sullom Voe, Shetland
Westgate-on-Sea, Kent
RAF Woodhaven, Woodhaven, Fife

See also
List of air stations of the Royal Navy
RAF Coastal Command
Royal Air Force
Royal Flying Corps
Royal Naval Air Service
Seaplane tender

References

London, Peter. British Flying Boats. Stroud, UK:Sutton Publishing, 2003. .

External links
HMS Osprey
           Index Of Naval Air Stations

 
 
Seaplane bases
Seaplane bases
Seaplane bases
UK Seaplane